The 1981 Clásica de San Sebastián was the inaugural edition of the Clásica de San Sebastián cycle race and was held on 11 August 1981. The race started and finished in San Sebastián. The race was won by Marino Lejarreta.

General classification

References

Clásica de San Sebastián
San